In enzymology, a phosphopantothenate—cysteine ligase also known as phosphopantothenoylcysteine synthetase  (PPCS) is an enzyme that catalyzes the chemical reaction which constitutes the second of five steps involved in the conversion of pantothenate to Coenzyme A. The reaction is:

NTP + (R)-4'-phosphopantothenate + L-cysteine  NMP + diphosphate + N-[(R)-4'-phosphopantothenoyl]-L-cysteine

The nucleoside triphosphate (NTP) involved in the reaction varies from species to species. Phosphopantothenate—cysteine ligase from the bacterium Escherichia coli uses cytidine triphosphate (CTP) as an energy donor, whilst the human isoform uses adenosine triphosphate (ATP).

Nomenclature 

This enzyme belongs to the family of ligases, specifically those forming carbon-nitrogen bonds as acid-D-amino-acid ligases (peptide syntheses).  The systematic name of this enzyme class is (R)-4'-phosphopantothenate:L-cysteine ligase. This enzyme is also called phosphopantothenoylcysteine synthetase.

Gene 

Phosphopantothenoylcysteine synthetase in humans is encoded by the PPCS gene.

Protein structure

References

Further reading

External links 
 PDBe-KB provides an overview of all the structure information available in the PDB for Human Phosphopantothenate—cysteine ligase

EC 6.3.2
Enzymes of known structure